Helgi Guðmundsson Thordersen (8 April 1794 - 4 December 1867) was an Icelandic politician and prelate who served as Bishop of Iceland from 1846 till 1866.

Biography
Thordersen graduated from the Latin school at Bessastaðir in 1813. He moved to Copenhagen in 1814 and graduated in theology in 1819. That same year, he returned to Iceland and taught children in Reykjavik the following winter. In 1820, he was ordained a priest in Hallgrímskirkja (Hvalfjörður). In 1836, he became a cathedral priest in Reykjavik and was bishop of Iceland from 1846 to 1866 as successor to Steingrímur Jónsson. He had no great importance in political life, but had a certain influence on the church legislative work during the first meetings, as well as in the relocation of the Latin school from Bessastaðir to Reykjavik and the establishment of the parsonage.

References

Lutheran bishops of Iceland
1794 births
1867 deaths
19th-century Lutheran bishops